Jacksonville Memorial Hospital (JMH), formerly known as Passavant Area Hospital is located in Jacksonville, Illinois, and has served residents in the following counties since 1875: Morgan, Cass, Greene, Scott, Macoupin, and portions of Brown and northern Pike counties. Jacksonville Memorial Hospital is a twice-designated Magnet hospital and is also accredited by The Joint Commission.  Jacksonville Memorial Hospital has approximately 900 employees and a 70 physician medical staff, making it the largest employer in Jacksonville.

Jacksonville Memorial Hospital provides inpatient and outpatient services, including rehab and behavioral health services. JMH is an affiliate of Memorial Health System based in Springfield, Illinois.

References 

https://memorial.health/jacksonville-memorial-hospital/overview
http://www.qualitycheck.org/qualityreport.aspx?hcoid=7362
http://www.hfsrb.illinois.gov/Jan15sbr/15.%2014-054%20Passavant%20Area%20Hospital1.pdf
https://www.passavanthospital.com/about-passavant/2015-annual-report/
http://www.hfsrb.illinois.gov/pdf/2013%20Hospital%20Inventory%20-%20Final.pdf

Hospitals in Illinois
Jacksonville, Illinois micropolitan area